Lucifer Rising may refer to:

 Lucifer Rising (Candlemass EP), or its title track
 Lucifer Rising (novel), a Doctor Who New Adventures novel by Andy Lane and Jim Mortimore
 Lucifer Rising (film), an experimental film by Kenneth Anger
 Lucifer Rising (Bobby Beausoleil album), soundtrack of the film
 Lucifer Rising (Kaamos album)
 "Lucifer Rising" (Supernatural), an episode of the television series Supernatural
 Lucifer Rising (book), a book by Gavin Baddeley
 "Lucifer Rising", a song by Rob Zombie from Venomous Rat Regeneration Vendor